Eduard "Edu" Grau, A.S.C.(born 1981) is a Spanish cinematographer, best known for his work on the films A Single Man (2009), Suffragette (2015), Gringo (2018) and his collaborations with director Joel Edgerton (2015 and 2018).

Grau is a three-times Camerimage Golden Frog nominee, winning Bronze for Buried in 2010. The same year, he was named as one of Variety's "10 Cinematographers to watch". Grau is a member of the Academy of Motion Picture Arts and Sciences since 2013. In January 2021, he became a member of the American Society of Cinematographers.

Life and work
Grau was born in Barcelona.

He graduated from the Cinema and Audiovisual School of Catalonia (Barcelona, Spain) and the National Film and Television School (Beaconsfield, UK).

Grau shot his first feature, Honor of the Knights by Catalan auteur Albert Serra, at age 23. It was screened in the Director's Fortnight section at the 2006 Cannes Film Festival alongside works by David Cronenberg, Gus Van Sant and William Friedkin.

After shooting his follow-up film Kicks with director Lindy Heymann, Grau was hired to be the cinematographer for fashion designer Tom Ford's film A Single Man starring Colin Firth and Julianne Moore at age 27. i-D magazine included the film on its list of the "35 most stylish films of all time".

After Grau's fourth feature film, Finisterrae,  was praised for its "splendid" and "painterly" imagery, he took on the challenging task to shoot Buried, starring Ryan Reynolds – a 95-minute film entirely set in a coffin underground.

While 2011's The Awakening was met with mixed reviews, critics noted that the film "looks great" and lauded "Eduard Grau’s elegant cinematography".

Grau lensed the music video for Lady Gaga's 2011 song Born This Way, directed by Nick Knight. The video won Gaga Best Female Video and Best Video with a Message at the 2011 MTV Video Music Awards. Grau also worked on campaigns for brands including Adidas, Apple, Gatorade, Nissan and Volkswagen.

Filmography

Film

References

External links



Spanish cinematographers
1981 births
Alumni of the National Film and Television School
People from Barcelona
Living people